Erkki Koskinen (5 October 1925 – 16 July 2009) was a Finnish cyclist. He competed in three events at the 1948 Summer Olympics.

References

External links
 

1925 births
2009 deaths
Finnish male cyclists
Olympic cyclists of Finland
Cyclists at the 1948 Summer Olympics
Sportspeople from Helsinki